Lei Li (born January 21, 1968) is a female Chinese softball player who competed in the 1996 Summer Olympics.

In 1996 she won the silver medal as part of the Chinese team. She played nine matches.

External links
profile

1968 births
Living people
Chinese softball players
Softball players at the 1996 Summer Olympics
Medalists at the 1996 Summer Olympics
Olympic silver medalists for China
Olympic softball players of China
Olympic medalists in softball
Asian Games medalists in softball
Softball players at the 1994 Asian Games
Medalists at the 1994 Asian Games
Asian Games gold medalists for China